The Student and Mister Henri (original title: L'Étudiante et Monsieur Henri) is a 2015 French comedy-drama film written and directed by  and based on Calbérac's 2012 play of the same name. It stars Claude Brasseur, Guillaume de Tonquedec, Noémie Schmidt and Frédérique Bel.

Noémie Schmidt won the Prix Premiers Rendez-vous (Best Newcomer) at the 2016 Cabourg Film Festival.

Cast
Claude Brasseur as Henri Voizot
Guillaume de Tonquédec as Paul Voizot
Noémie Schmidt as Constance Piponnier
Frédérique Bel as Valérie Voizot
Thomas Solivéres as Matthieu
Valérie Kéruzoré as Constance's mother
Stéphan Wojtowicz as Constance's father
Antoine Glémain as Constance's brother 
Grégori Baquet as Arthur
Pierre Cassignard

Reception
On review aggregator website Rotten Tomatoes, The Student and Mister Henri has an approval rating of 70% based on 10 reviews, with an average rating of 5.50/10.

References

External links

2015 comedy-drama films
French comedy-drama films
2010s French-language films
French films based on plays
Films set in Paris
StudioCanal films
2010s French films